

The Blériot-SPAD S.64 was a French two-seat, single-engine biplane flight training aircraft designed in the 1920s.

Design
The S.64 was a biplane of wood and canvas construction.

Specification

References

Blériot aircraft
Single-engined tractor aircraft
Biplanes
1920s French military trainer aircraft
Aircraft first flown in 1923
Rotary-engined aircraft